The following is a list of people from Wollongong, New South Wales, Australia, as well as its surrounding suburbs:

Politics 

 Rex Connor, Minister for Minerals and Energy in the Whitlam government
 Bryan Green, member of the Tasmanian House of Assembly
 Dr. Stephen Martin, former Speaker of the Australian House of Representatives

Arts and media 
Natalie Bassingthwaighte, actress and singer, lead vocalist of Rogue Traders
Michael Cusack, animator and voice actor, Smiling Friends and Koala Man
Adam Demos, actor, Sex/Life
Nikki Gemmell, author
Ricardo Gonçalves, television journalist and presenter
Steven Jacobs, actor and television presenter
John Jarratt, actor, Wolf Creek
Catriona Rowntree, television presenter 
Nic Testoni, actor, Home and Away
Richard Tognetti, violinist, current artistic director of the Australian Chamber Orchestra
Anthony Warlow, opera and musical theater star
Frenchy, comedian and podcaster

Sports 

Bill Beach, World Champion Sculler (Rowing) 1884–7
Nicole Beck, Rugby sevens, current Australian player and Olympic gold medalist, Rio 2016
Michael Bolt, rugby league player 
Shaun Boyle, Winter Olympic athlete in skeleton
Greg Carberry, rugby league player 
Scott Chipperfield, retired football (soccer) player who played for the Australia men's national soccer team
Allan Fitzgibbon, former professional rugby league footballer and coach
Craig Fitzgibbon, rugby league player and coach, coach of the Cronulla Sharks
Tyson Frizell, professional rugby league player currently playing for the Newcastle Knights in the NRL.
Wayne Gardner, 500cc motorcycle racing world champion
Jackson Hastings, professional rugby league player who has played for Wigan Warriors and Salford Red Devils in the Super League.
Brian Hetherington, rugby league player
Matt Horsley, former football (soccer) player
Bruno Hortelano, Spanish runner, Gold Medallist
Dan Hunt, rugby league player
Ben Hornby, rugby league player who captained the St George Illawarra Dragons
Phil Jaques, cricketer
Trent Johnston, Irish cricketer 
Brett Lee, Test cricketer
Shane Lee, former One-Day International cricketer
Kerryn McCann, marathon runner, Commonwealth games gold medalist
Emma McKeon, swimmer, five-time Olympic and eight-time Commonwealth gold medalist
Dean Mercer, iron man
Trent Merrin, rugby league player 
Reagan Ogle, football (soccer) player who plays professionally in England
Jason Ryles, rugby league player and coach
Noel Spencer, football (soccer) player formerly of Sydney FC
Mile Sterjovski, retired football (soccer) player who played in France, Switzerland and England; as well as for the Socceroos
Brett Stewart, rugby league player
Glenn Stewart, rugby league player
Jacob Timpano, football (soccer) player who played for Sydney FC and has also managed Wollongong Wolves
Emma Tonegato, rugby sevens, current Australian player and Olympic gold medallist, Rio 2016
Alexander Volkanovski, Mixed Martial Artist and current UFC Featherweight Champion
Luke Wilkshire, former football (soccer) player, commentator

Other 
William F. Roy, former Principal Technical Officer at Telecom Tower.
Hal Waldron, prospector and gold diviner.

References

 
Wollongong
Wollongong
People